Ski jumping at the 2012 Winter Youth Olympics was held at the Toni-Seelos-Olympiaschanze in Seefeld, Austria on 14 January. For the first time ever women competed in ski jumping at an Olympic event

Events
The ski jumping event included the boys' individual event and, for the first time at the Olympics, the girls' individual event. There was also a mixed team event, with a team consisted of a girl, a boy, and a nordic combined athlete.

Medal summary

Medal table

Events

Qualification

Nations scoring points in the Marc Hodler Trophy were guaranteed one athlete as was the host nation (8 countries). The remaining spots were distributed according to the normal hill results from the World Junior Championships. There were 25 spots reserved for the boys' competition but due to reallocation it was only 24. The updated quota spots were announced on December 13, 2011, which are subject to change.

References

 
2012 Winter Youth Olympics events
2012 in ski jumping
2012
Ski jumping competitions in Austria